Dysart is a town and a locality in the Isaac Region, Queensland, Australia. It is a service centre for mines and grazing properties in the district. Most residents are employed by the coal mines.

Geography

Railways 
The locality is served by the Goonyella railway network which connects the Bowen Basin coalfields with the coal wharves at Hay Point on the coast. The locality is served by numerous railway stations (from north to south):

 Winchester railway station
 Harrow railway station
 Saraji Junction railway station
 Saraji railway station
 Lake Vermont railway station
 Dysart railway station
 Stephens railway station
 Norwich Park Junction railway station
 Norwich Park railway station

Mountains 
The terrain is mountainous, with the following named peaks (from north to south):

 Walkers Peak 
 Mount Phillips 
 Mount Walker 
 Campbell Peak 
 Lords Table Mountain
 Gilberts Dome 
 Browns Peak 
 Charleys Peak 
 Eastern Peak 
 Mount Dalrymple 
 Expedition Peak

History 
Prussian explorer Ludwig Leichhardt explored the region in 1845 being the first European to do so. This included climbing to the summit of nearby Campbells Peak and allegedly building a stone cairn there.

The town of Dysart was established in 1973 to support the Saraji coal mine with the Post Office opening on 8 October 1973. The name Dysart comes from the name of a pastoral run and a parish in the area; it means a retreat for monks and hence solitude in Irish Gaelic.

Dysart State School opened on 21 May 1973. A secondary department was added in 1979, which operated until Dysart State High School opened on 20 September 1980.

The Dysart Library opened in 1982.

At the 2016 census, the locality had a population of 2,991 people.

Economy 
It closed on 11 April 2012, after 32 years of operation. In 2020, the Norwich Park mine reopened under the new name Saraji South.

Housing 
According to the Real Estate Institute of Queensland in 2011, Dysart had a median rent of $1,200 a week for a house, making it the most expensive in Queensland. In 2012, the median house price in the town was $475,000. The closure of the Norwich Park Mine was expected to bring property prices down. In August 2015, rental price for a three-bedroom home in Dysart started at $130 a week.

Education 
Dysart State School is a government primary (Prep-6) school for boys and girls at Garnham Drive. In 2018, the school had an enrolment of 347 students with 25 teachers (24 full-time equivalent) and 15 non-teaching staff (9 full-time equivalent).

Dysart State High School is a government secondary (7-12) school for boys and girls at Edgerley Street. In 2018, the school had an enrolment of 162 students with 17 teachers (16 full-time equivalent) and 20 non-teaching staff (13 full-time equivalent).

Sport 
Rugby league is a popular sport in Dysart. Dysart junior team is named 'Dysart Bulls' with team colours of red, black and white. The senior team is also called 'Dysart Bulls' and has about six home games a year. The Bulls were the junior home team of Matt Sing, who played 24 State of Origin Games for Queensland.

Dysart also has a very popular soccer team, the Dysart Devils.

Amenities 
The Isaac Regional Council operates a public library located in Shannon Crescent, Dysart.

Events 
Dysart is home to Norwich Park Mines Day, held to increase the public's knowledge of the mining industry.

Attractions 
A monument to the coal and rail industry consisting of a large truck and coal wagon is located at the northern entrance to the town.

References

External links
 University of Queensland: Queensland Places: Dysart

Mining towns in Queensland
Towns in Queensland
Central Queensland
Populated places established in 1973
1973 establishments in Australia
Isaac Region
Localities in Queensland